Union Sportive Cognaçaise is a French rugby union club, based in Cognac in the Charente département (Nouvelle-Aquitaine region). They play at the Parc des Sports (capacity 2,800), and wear white and red.

They were founded on 2 December 1898 and regularly competed in the first division in the 1950s and 1960s. They played in the 1954 French championship final, going down narrowly to FC Grenoble 3-5. They are currently competing in the fifth level of the French league system, Fédérale 3.

Club honours
 French premiership : runner-up 1954
 Challenge Yves-du-Manoir (French cup) 1965
 Second division champions 1995

Famous players
 Jacques Fouroux
 Gérald Merceron
 David Esnault

External links
 Official site (work in progress)

Cognac
Union Sportive Cognacaise
1899 establishments in France